Robert II, Count of Flanders (c. 1065 – 5 October 1111) was Count of Flanders from 1093 to 1111. He became known as Robert of Jerusalem (Robertus Hierosolimitanus) or Robert the Crusader after his exploits in the First Crusade.

Early life
Robert was the eldest son of Robert I of Flanders (also known as Robert the Frisian) and Gertrude of Saxony. His father, hoping to place the cadet branch (or "Baldwinite" branch) of Flanders over the county, began to associate him with his rule around 1086. From 1085 to 1091 he was regent of the county while his father was away on pilgrimage to the Holy Land.

First Crusade

After becoming count in 1093, Robert joined the First Crusade, launched by Pope Urban II in 1095. He made his wife, Clementia of Burgundy, regent in Flanders, and formed the army of Robert the Crusader that followed the retinue of his kinsman Godfrey of Bouillon, Duke of Lower Lorraine. After reaching Constantinople, the crusaders were obliged to swear an oath of fealty to Byzantine emperor Alexius I Komnenus and promise to return to the Byzantine Empire any land they might capture. Robert, whose father had already served Alexius during his pilgrimage in the 1080s, had no problem swearing this oath, but some of the other leaders did and there was some delay in leaving the city.

Robert then participated in the Siege of Nicaea, after which the army was split into two groups. Robert marched with Stephen of Blois, Bohemond of Taranto, Robert Curthose, and the Byzantine guides, one day ahead of the rest of the crusaders. This army was surrounded by the Seljuk sultan Kilij Arslan at the Battle of Dorylaeum on 30 June 1097. The next day, the second army, led by Raymond IV of Toulouse, Godfrey of Bouillon, and Hugh of Vermandois, arrived and broke the encirclement; the two armies joined together, with Robert and Raymond forming the centre. The Turks were defeated and the crusaders continued their march.

At the end of 1097 the crusaders arrived at Antioch. The Siege of Antioch lasted many months; in December, Robert and Bohemund briefly left the army to raid the surrounding territory for food, and on 30 December they defeated an army sent to relieve Antioch, led by Duqaq, ruler of Damascus. Antioch was eventually betrayed to Bohemund by an Armenian guard, and Robert was among the first to enter the city, but only a few days later they were themselves besieged by Kerbogha. atabeg of Mosul. On 28 June 1098, the crusaders marched out to meet him in battle. Robert and Hugh of Vermandois led the first of six divisions. Kerbogha was defeated and the Muslim-held citadel finally surrendered to the crusaders. Robert, along with Bohemond, Raymond, and Godfrey, occupied the citadel, but Bohemund soon claimed the city for himself. Raymond also claimed it, but Robert supported Bohemund in this dispute.

The dispute delayed the crusade even further. Raymond left Antioch to attack Ma'arrat al-Numan, which was captured. Robert took part in this siege as well. Raymond then tried to bribe Robert and the other leaders to follow him instead of Bohemund; Robert was offered six thousand sous, but each attempted bribe was ignored. Raymond continued south to Jerusalem in January, 1099, but Robert and Godfrey remained behind in Antioch until February. They rejoined Raymond's army at the Siege of Arqa. In June, Robert and Gaston IV of Bearn led the vanguard which arrived at Ramla, and with Tancred, he led an expedition into Samaria to find wood in order to construct siege engines for the Siege of Jerusalem. When Jerusalem was captured on 15 July, Robert supported Godfrey's claim over that of Raymond, and on August 9 marched out with him to meet the Fatimid army under al-Afdal Shahanshah which was coming to relieve Jerusalem. Robert formed part of the centre wing in the ensuing Battle of Ascalon, which resulted in a crusader victory. However, Godfrey and Raymond quarrelled over possession of Ascalon, and even Robert could not support Godfrey in this dispute; the city remained uncaptured, although the victory allowed for the establishment of the Kingdom of Jerusalem.

At the end of August, Robert returned home with Robert Curthose and Raymond. On the way back they captured Latakia, which was returned to the Byzantine emperor, as promised years before. Raymond remained there but both Roberts continued home by way of Constantinople, after declining Alexius' request to stay there in his service. Robert brought back with him a precious relic, the arm of Saint George, a gift from Alexius. The relic was placed in the church of Anchin Abbey in Flanders. After he returned, Robert built the monastery of St. Andrew in Sevenkerke (now Zevenkerke, near Bruges. Because of his crusade and the spoils he brought home, he was nicknamed Robert of Jerusalem.

Later life

During his absence, Holy Roman Emperor Henry IV had tried to seize imperial Flanders. Robert responded by supporting the revolt of the Commune of Cambrai against the emperor and his supporter, Bishop Gaulcher, and seized a number of castles. Peace was restored in 1102 and homage paid to the emperor for imperial Flanders, but after 1105, the new emperor, Henry V, marched on Flanders, with the aid of Count Baldwin III of Hainaut and an army from Holland. Robert stopped them outside of Douai and a new peace was signed, in which the emperor recognized Robert's claim to Douai and Cambrai.

In 1103 he made an alliance with Henry I of England, offering 1000 cavalry in exchange for an annual tribute. When Henry refused to pay, Robert allied with his nominal overlord, Louis VI of France, and attacked Normandy. With the king diverted, Theobald IV of Blois led a revolt of the French barons. Robert led an army against Meaux. During the battle he fell off his horse and was trampled to death on 5 October 1111.

Family
He married Clementia of Burgundy, sister of Pope Callistus II and daughter of William I, Count of Burgundy. They had three children, but only the oldest survived to adulthood. He succeeded Robert as Baldwin VII of Flanders.

References

Sources

1060s births
1111 deaths
House of Flanders
Robert II
Christians of the First Crusade
Deaths by horse-riding accident in France
12th-century people from the county of Flanders